Bithia may refer to:

Bithia or Bithiah, a traditional name attributed to the biblical Pharaoh's daughter
Bithia, a city in ancient Sardinia and Corsica